A one-syllable article is a type of constrained writing found in Chinese literature. It takes advantage of the large number of homophones in the Chinese language, particularly when writing in Classical Chinese due to historic sound changes. While the characters used in a one-syllable article have many different meanings, they are all pronounced as the same syllable, although not with the same tone. Therefore, a one-syllable article is comprehensible in writing but becomes an incomprehensible tongue twister when read aloud, especially in Mandarin Chinese pronunciation. In other regional pronunciations, not all syllables may sound alike.

Notable examples

Lion-Eating Poet in the Stone Den, by Yuen Ren Chao
, by He Yuanwai







See also
 Buffalo buffalo Buffalo buffalo buffalo buffalo Buffalo buffalo
 James while John had had had had had had had had had had had a better effect on the teacher

External links
The story of a lion eating a pig Over 600 characters

Constrained writing
Chinese literature
Chinese language
Language games
Homonymy in Chinese